Christian Albert (June 13, 1842– April 16, 1922) was an American soldier who received the Medal of Honor for valor during the American Civil War.

Biography
Christian Albert was born in Cincinnati, Ohio in 1842. While a Private in Company G of the 47th Ohio Infantry, he distinguished himself at the Battle of Vicksburg on May 22, 1863.

He is buried in Woodlawn Cemetery in Toledo, Ohio.

Medal of Honor citation
Rank and organization: Private, Company G, 47th Ohio Infantry. Place and date: At Vicksburg, Miss., May 22, 1863. Entered service at: ------. Birth: Cincinnati, Ohio. Date of issue: August 10, 1895.

Citation:

Gallantry in the charge of the "volunteer storming party."

See also
 List of Medal of Honor recipients
 List of American Civil War Medal of Honor recipients: A–F
 Battle of Vicksburg
 47th Ohio Infantry

Notes

References

External links
 
 A Forlorn Hope
 Vicksburg Medal of Honor Recipients

1842 births
1922 deaths
Union Army soldiers
United States Army Medal of Honor recipients
People of Ohio in the American Civil War
Military personnel from Cincinnati
American Civil War recipients of the Medal of Honor